Diesing is a surname. Notable people with it include:

 Freda Diesing (1925–2002), Canadian sculptor
 Karl Moriz Diesing (1800–1867), Austrian naturalist and zoologist
 Ulrich Diesing (1911–1945), German pilot

German-language surnames